Dharma is a 1973 Bollywood action film directed by Chand. The film stars Pran in the title role. The rest of the cast includes Ajit, Madan Puri, Bindu and the pair Navin Nischol and Rekha.  The film became a "Superhit" at the box office. It was remade into the Telugu film Na Pere Bhagavan (1976).

Plot
Sevak Singh Dharma is a dreaded dacoit living in isolation with his followers Bhairav Singh (Rajan Haksar), Mangal Singh (Madan Puri) and his wife Parvati (Geeta Siddharth) amongst others. He kills Bhairav for betraying his trust during a police encounter. While escaping in a boat, both his young son, Suraj, and wife are hit by gunfire by inspector Ajit Singh (Ajit) and considered drowned, while he survives and lands up in a city as the feared dacoit, Chandan Singh. Chandan Singh takes revenge on Ajit Singh's family and abducts his wife Asha and daughter Radha (both played by Rekha). Asha gets killed accidentally while Radha is rescued by a prostitute. Flash forward: Ajit Singh is now the Inspector General of Police; Chandan Singh is impersonating Nawab Sikander Bakht. Radha is a dancer who flips for Raju (Navin Nischol) Chandan's second-in-command. In time, Chandan tells Ajit that she is his daughter, and he should take charge of her. Even though Ajit suspects Raju's true identity, he admits him into the police force with the explicit duty of arresting Chandan who, after the truth about him comes in the open, is on the run. Bottles of blood and bullets run amuck in sequences leading towards the climax; the truth about Raju (or Suraj), now a police inspector, is revealed in the encounter between father and son. Chandan gives himself up to the police.

Cast
Pran as Sevak Singh / Dharam Singh "Dharma" / Chandan Seth / Nawab Sikandar Mirza
Navin Nischol as Suraj / Raju
Rekha as Asha Singh / Radha (Double Role) 
Ajit as Inspector Ajit Singh 
Madan Puri as Mangal Singh 
Rajan Haksar as Bhairav Singh
Ramesh Deo as Chaman Singh 
Mohan Choti as Car Mechanic 
Asit Sen as Seth Garibdas 
Anjali Kadam as Parvati Singh 
Chandrashekhar 
Murad as Seth
Bindu as Bindiya
Helen as Cabaret Dancer #1
Faryal as Cabaret Dancer #2
Sonia Sahni as Cabaret Dancer #3  
Jayshree T. as Cabaret Dancer #4

Crew
 Stunt - A. Gani
 Art - D. S. Malvankar
 Choreography - Surya Kumar
 Audiography - Harbans Singh

Soundtrack
Lyrics written by Verma Malik and music composed by Sonik Omi.

References

External links
 

1973 films
Films scored by Sonik-Omi
1970s Hindi-language films
1973 action films
Hindi films remade in other languages
Indian action films
Hindi-language action films